The Conservative People's Party (PCP) is a minor social conservative political party in Argentina founded in 1958 by Vicente Solano Lima, who was vice president of Argentina in 1973. It was founded as a split from the National Democratic Party (PDN) following the 1955 coup that ousted Juan Domingo Perón from the presidency. 

A historical ally of Peronism and the Justicialist Party, in recent years the PCP has backed anti-peronist parties and alliances, and was one of the founding parties of the Cambiemos coalition in 2015. Ahead of the 2019 general election, the PCP left Cambiemos and instead joined the newly formed NOS Front, backing the candidacy of Falklands War veteran Juan José Gómez Centurión. Gómez Centurión placed fifth in the presidential race with 2.6% of the vote.

It presently counts with no representation at the federal level.

References

Political parties established in 1958
1958 establishments in Argentina
Right-wing parties in Argentina
Conservative parties in Argentina
Peronist parties and alliances in Argentina